Yim Myung-ok (Hangul: 임명옥, Hanja: 林明玉; born 15 March 1986) is a South Korean professional volleyball player. She was part of the silver medal winning team at the 2010 Asian Games. She was part of the South Korea national team at the 2010 World Championship.

References

1986 births
Living people
South Korean women's volleyball players
Asian Games medalists in volleyball
Volleyball players at the 2010 Asian Games
Volleyball players at the 2018 Asian Games
Medalists at the 2010 Asian Games
Medalists at the 2018 Asian Games
Asian Games silver medalists for South Korea
Asian Games bronze medalists for South Korea